Älgarnas Trädgård were a psychedelic and progressive rock band from Sweden which is found on the Nurse With Wound list.

In 1972, they released . More recently, in 2001, archived recordings from 1974 were released under the album title Delayed.

References

Swedish progressive rock groups